Maria Kusters-ten Beitel (born 20 September 1949) is a retired Dutch rower. Her teams finished fourth at the 1975 World Championships and eighth at the 1976 Summer Olympics in the coxed eights event.

Kusters-ten Beitel studied medicine in Nijmegen and later worked as a doctor. She is married to Gerard Kusters, also a rower and a doctor, who was the coach of the Dutch female coxed four team at the 1976 Olympics.

References

1949 births
Living people
Dutch female rowers
Olympic rowers of the Netherlands
Rowers at the 1976 Summer Olympics
People from Berkelland
Sportspeople from Gelderland